Colebrooke Island is an island of the Andaman Islands. It belongs to the North and Middle Andaman administrative district, part of the Indian union territory of Andaman and Nicobar Islands. It is named after Robert Hyde Colebrooke who surveyed the region along with Archibald Blair.

Geography
The island belongs to the East Baratang Group and lies east of Baratang.

Administration
Politically, Colebrooke Island, along neighboring East Baratang Group, is part of Rangat Taluk.

References 

Islands of North and Middle Andaman district
Uninhabited islands of India
Islands of India
Islands of the Bay of Bengal